Yoan Pivaty (born 29 January 1990) is a Martinique international footballer who plays for SO Romorantin He plays as a winger, second striker or forward.

Club career
Pivaty is a Rennes youth product. In August 2015 he joined Le Mans FC.

International career
Born in Montreuil, France, in October 2012, Pivaty received his first call-up to play for the Martinique national team for Caribbean Championship qualifiers against Puerto Rico, Dominican Republic and Guadeloupe. He made his debut on 23 October, in a 2–1 win over Puerto Rico.

References

External links

1990 births
Living people
French footballers
Martiniquais footballers
Martinique international footballers
Association football midfielders
Stade Rennais F.C. players
La Vitréenne FC players
ES Viry-Châtillon players
FC Etar 1924 Veliko Tarnovo players
US Avranches players
Le Mans FC players
SO Romorantin players
First Professional Football League (Bulgaria) players
Expatriate footballers in Bulgaria